Stefano Rubbi (born 30 July 2002) is an Italian professional footballer who plays as a goalkeeper for  club Pergolettese, on loan from Monza.

Club career

Caravaggio 
Rubbi played youth football for Sarnico, before joining Caravaggio in 2018. His debut came in the 2019–20 Serie D season, playing 19 games.

Monza 
On 1 July 2020, Rubbi joined Serie B club Monza's youth setup. He was first called up to the first team on 27 October 2020, as an unused substitute in a Coppa Italia game against Pordenone. Rubbi played 31 games for the Primavera (under-19) side between the 2020–21 and 2021–22 seasons, and made 22 appearances as an unused substitute for the first team.

Loan to Pergolettese 
On 15 July 2022, Rubbi renewed his contract with Monza until 30 June 2024, and was sent on a one-year loan to Serie C side Lecco. The loan was terminated on 29 July, and Rubbi was loaned out to fellow Serie C side Pergolettese the same day. He debuted against Lecco on 10 September, as a half-time substitute in a 2–0 away defeat.

International career 
In 2020, Rubbi played for the Lega Nazionale Dilettanti representative under-18 team; he was capped three times at the "Roma Caput Mundi" tournament.

Career statistics

Club

References

External links 
 
 

2002 births
Living people
Footballers from Bergamo
Italian footballers
Association football goalkeepers
U.S.D. Caravaggio players
A.C. Monza players
Calcio Lecco 1912 players
U.S. Pergolettese 1932 players
Serie D players
Serie C players